The Original Factory Shop is a discount department store chain that was established in 1969. It currently operates over two hundred stores across the United Kingdom.

History
The Original Factory Shop was established in 1969 as part of Peter Black's retail network. Initially it sold soap manufactured by one of Black's factories. The chain now has 215 outlets and has plans to have 500 stores by 2020. 

In August 2011, the chain did not perform as well with profits reduced, due to economic conditions and massive investment in the chain, including many store openings, expansion of headquarters and warehouse and upgrading store equipment. The chief executive of The Original Factory Shop is former Lloyds Pharmacy boss Tony Page, who replaced Angela Spindler in June 2013. In May 2010, rumours surfaced that the parent company Duke Street Capital put the chain up for sale for £200 million. These rumours were later denied by The Original Factory Shop and Duke Street Capital. 

On 26 June 2018, it was announced that The Original Factory Shop is to close 32 stores due to falling profits, and the withdrawal of its credit insurance. The Original Factory Shop has also reported that it will be unsurprisingly starting a company voluntary arrangement process.

The group's profits soared, post the COVID-19 pandemic, in the financial year 2021/22. Total revenue throughout the organization was £124.4 million, a growth of 250%. Actual profit being recorded at £8.5 million, up £2.4 million on the previous year.

Operations
The chain sell fashion, homewares, toys and personal care products. The products can be from the chain's own lines, branded products or cut label products from a high street chain or supermarket.

In the middle of 2010, The Original Factory Shop opened its online store.

References

External links
 The Original Factory Shop Online Store Website

Retail companies of the United Kingdom
Discount shops of the United Kingdom
Retail companies established in 1969
Companies based in Burnley